Pareupithecia is a genus of moths in the family Geometridae. It contains only one species, Pareupithecia spadix, which is found in the Russian Far East (southern Primorje), Korea, Japan (Honshu) and Shanxi, China.

The ground colour of the forewings is grey to dark brown, sometimes with rusty tinge. There is a broad, dark brown medial area distinctly bordered by fine, black transverse lines. The hindwings are paler with distinct transverse lines and a discal dot.

References

Moths described in 1955
Eupitheciini
Moths of Japan